Aishah Shahidah Simmons is an American documentary filmmaker, author, educator, and activist based in Philadelphia, PA.  

Her 2006 film NO! The Rape Documentary addressed sexual assault in the black community, a topic that has, according to Cynthia Greenlee-Donnell "traditionally been so attuned to racism outside that it has largely turned a deaf ear and a blind eye to gender violence within." In a review of NO!, Andrea Williams described the film as, "notable, not only for its critical exposition, but also for the ways in which it places Black women's voices at the center of its narrative."

Career 
Simmons has held professorships at universities throughout the United States. She was the 2015-2016 Sterling Brown Professor of Africana Studies at Williams College, an Adjunct Professor in the Women’s and LGBT Studies Program at Temple University, an O’Brien Distinguished Visiting Professor in the Feminist, Gender and Sexuality Studies Department at Scripps College, and a Visiting Lecturer in the Department of Cinema and Media Studies at the University of Chicago. She was an Artist-in-Residence at the Center for the Study of Race, Politics and Culture at the University of Chicago and at Spelman College’s Digital Moving Image Salon.

Awards and honors 
 Amnesty International Women’s Human Rights Program Discretionary Grant (2003)
 Rockefeller Foundation Artist’s Fellowship nominee (2003)
 Gloria Steinem Fund of the Ms. Foundation for Women (2004)
 National Sexual Violence Resource Center's National Award for Outstanding Response to and Prevention of Sexual Violence (2006)
 Artist-in-Residence, Center for the Study of Race, Politics and Culture, University of Chicago (2009)
 NO! The Rape Documentary included in Ford Foundation's JustFilms online archive (2011)
 Co-honoree, with Staceyann Chinn and Fadzai Muparutsa (Coalition of African Lesbians), Black Women's Blueprint's performance (2013)
 Sterling Brown '22 Visiting Professor of Africana Studies, Williams College (2016)
 Just Beginnings Collaborative Fellow (2016-2018)

Filmography 
 “Feminists We Love”: Linda Janet Holmes (2014) Color/Digital Video/60-minutes 
 “Feminists We Love”: Gloria I. Josepeh, Ph.D. (2014) Color/Digital Video/60-minutes 
 “Feminists We Love”: Elizabeth Lorde-Rollins, M.D., M.Sc., (2014) Color/Digital Video/60-minutes 
 Breaking Silences: A Supplemental Video to NO! (2008), USA Color/Digital Video/112 minutes 
 For Women of Rage and Reason (2006), USA Color/Digital Video/4:40 minutes 
 NO! The Rape Documentary (2006), USA Color/Digital Video 94-minutes 
 NO! A Work-in-Progress (1997, 2000, 2002), USA, Color/Digital Video/8-minutes, 20-minutes- and 74-minutes 
 In My Father’s House (1996), USA, Color/Video/15-minutes 
 Silence…Broken (1993), USA, Color/Video/8-minutes

References 

Year of birth missing (living people)
Living people
American documentary filmmakers
Williams College faculty
Temple University faculty
American activists
Lambda Literary Award winners